Calonarius splendens is a species of fungus in the family Cortinariaceae. It is commonly known as the splendid webcap. The species is native to Europe where it has been implicated in poisonings resulting in kidney failure, though with milder symptoms than other deadly webcaps.

Taxonomy 
The species was described in 1939 by the mycologist Robert Henry who classified it as Cortinarius splendens.

In 2022 the species was transferred from Cortinarius and reclassified as Calonarius splendens based on genomic data.

Habitat and distribution 
It has been classed as conspecific with Cortinarius meinhardii, although the two species have different tree hosts—the former with the  European beech (Fagus sylvatica) and the latter with Norway spruce (Picea abies).

See also
List of Cortinarius species

References

splendens
Fungi described in 1939
Fungi of Europe
Poisonous fungi